Gloster is an unincorporated community in Gwinnett County, in the U.S. state of Georgia.

History
A post office named Glouster was established in 1892, and remained in operation until 1946. The community was named after a railroad worker.

References

Unincorporated communities in Gwinnett County, Georgia
Unincorporated communities in Georgia (U.S. state)